Tallboy or tall boy may refer to:

 Tallboy (bomb), a British deep penetration earthquake bomb of the Second World War
 Tallboy (furniture), a piece of furniture incorporating a chest of drawers and a wardrobe
 Tallboy beer can, a  beer beverage can in the United States
 Tall Boy, a lager-style beer produced in Vietnam by Bier Hoi Brewing Company
 Air dancer, an inflatable moving advertising device originally called the Tall Boy
 Mountain bike made by Santa Cruz Bicycles
 Spanker (sail), a type of sail also known as a tallboy
 Tall Boy (character), a character in the U.S. TV series Riverdale

See also 
 Tailboys (disambiguation)